Temnothorax fragosus, also known as the Ragged Divided ant, is a species of ant endemic to Alberta, Canada.

References 

Insects described in 2002
Endemic fauna of Canada
Myrmicinae